Walker River State Recreation Area is a 12,856 acre state park unit of Nevada along the East Walker River near the city of Yerington.   The park is one of Nevada's largest and newest state park units, dedicated by Governor Brian Sandoval on September 18, 2018. The park is composed of four units consisting of historical ranch land. The land was officially reconveyed to the state in 2017 by the Walker Basin Conservancy, a nonprofit dedicated to the restoration Walker Lake while protecting environmental, agricultural and recreational interests. The Walker Basin Conservancy purchased the water rights and accompanying land for the benefit of Walker Lake. The Walker Basin Conservancy will maintain stewardship activities on the land.

References

Parks in Nevada